Diocese of Moosonee can refer to the following Canadian entities:
 Anglican Diocese of Moosonee
 Roman Catholic Diocese of Moosonee, defunct
 Roman Catholic Diocese of Hearst–Moosonee, current